Woman's Progress in Literature, Science, Art, Education and Politics was a women's rights journal published from a Catholic women's perspective. The founders were sisters, Marianne and Jane Campbell. The first issues came out in 1893 and the periodical ran until 1896.

History 
Woman's Progress was founded by Jane and Marianne Campbell in 1892. The journal ran until 1896. The Campbell sisters wrote under the pseudonyms, "T.S. Arthur" and "Catherine Osborne". The first editions came out in 1893 and included contributions from Mary Grew, Elizabeth Powell Bond, and more. Grew was featured in the "Representative Women" columns that the periodical featured. As Catholics, the Campbells often focused on Catholic women in the periodical, though the sister also featured non-Catholics working to achieve women's rights and other similar goals. The paper also supported women's suffrage. It tackled issues that were considered both progressive at the time and also gave time to conservative issues.

References

Sources

External links 
 Archives

1892 establishments in Pennsylvania
1896 disestablishments in Pennsylvania
Feminist magazines
Catholic magazines
Women's suffrage in Pennsylvania
Women's suffrage publications in the United States
Mass media in Philadelphia